Marino is a rural locality (a village) in Andreyevsky Selsoviet, Ilishevsky District, Bashkortostan, Russia. The population was 155 as of 2010. There are 2 streets.

Geography 
Marino is located 37 km north of Verkhneyarkeyevo (the district's administrative centre) by road. Shidali is the nearest rural locality.

References 

Rural localities in Ilishevsky District